Vaikne is a lake in Estonia. It is just outside the town of Elva, about 30 km southeast of the capital Tartu.

See also
List of lakes of Estonia

Lakes of Estonia
Nõo Parish
Lakes of Tartu County